Krzysztof Kiercz (born 16 February 1989) is a Polish footballer who plays as a centre-back for Korona Kielce II.

Career
Kiercz is a homegrown of Korona Kielce and was included in its first team in 2009. In 2010 he was loaned to the I liga side LKS Nieciecza, for which he played three matches. In August 2010, he suffered a rupture of the fibula. Initial diagnoses assumed a one-month break in the game, but ultimately Kiercz dropped out of the squad for the entire round. Before the start of the spring round he was present at the tests in the II liga side Wisła Płock. Ultimately, Kiercz found himself on a six-month loan in the III liga side Wierna Małogoszcz, where he played in thirteen matches and scored two goals.

In the autumn round of the 2015–16 Ekstraklasa season, he played a total of four games. In addition, he played in the match against Wda Świecie in the Polish Cup, as the team captain. On December 28, 2015, Korona Kielce confirmed that the contract with him, expiring at the end of the year, will not be extended. On March 29, 2016, he signed a six-month contract to play in Odra Opole. He played for the new club in seven matches, scoring two goals and reaching promotion to the II liga. After the end of the season, Odra decided not to extend the expiring contract.

On July 15, 2016, he signed a contract with Stal Mielec. Kiercz played a total of three seasons for this club, leaving on May 30, 2019. On September 6, 2019, he became a player of the II liga side Stal Stalowa Wola. In August 2020, his contract expired. In November 2020, he joined the III liga side Broń Radom.

Career statistics

References

External links 
 
 

1989 births
Living people
Polish footballers
Broń Radom players
Bruk-Bet Termalica Nieciecza players
Korona Kielce players
Odra Opole players
Stal Mielec players
Stal Stalowa Wola players
Ekstraklasa players
I liga players
II liga players
III liga players
Place of birth missing (living people)
Association football defenders